Not to be confused with Razer Inc.

RAESR (unabbreviated as Rice Advanced Engineering Systems and Research) is an American automobile manufacturer founded in 2014 in Los Angeles, California by Eric Rice. The company is based in Los Angeles, California and specializes in the production of electric sports cars. Their prototype model, the "Tachyon Speed", was first introduced to the public in late 2017 through an electric vehicle infrastructure series made by E.ON, one of Europe's largest energy conglomerates.

Company 

The company was founded  in 2014 in Los Angeles, California by Eric Rice. Rice came up with the inspiration for the car in 2012, by drawing an early version of the car which looked like a jet fighter fuselage. This encouraged him to build the car. He started with the chassis production and brought on other engineers and designers to help. For their first model they came up with name Tachyon, which is a hypothetical particle that always travels faster than light. The word tachyon comes from the Greek word "tachus," which means "fast."

In 2017, RAESR completed production of their first prototype, the Tachyon Speed, and started working on their first production model.

Their cars are electric, using rechargeable batteries.

Tachyon Speed prototype 

 The RAESR Tachyon Speed is a prototype electric sports car produced in-house by RAESR in Los Angeles, California. RAESR claims their design was inspired by a jet fighter and Le Mans Prototype.

See also 
 Rimac Automobili
 Tesla
 Pininfarina

References

External links 
 http://www.raesr.com – RAESR website

Car manufacturers of the United States
Battery electric vehicle manufacturers
Electric vehicle manufacturers of the United States
Luxury motor vehicle manufacturers
Motor vehicle manufacturers based in California
Sports car manufacturers
Car brands